Strabena mabillei is a butterfly in the family Nymphalidae. It is found on Madagascar. The habitat consists of forests.

References

Strabena
Butterflies described in 1899
Endemic fauna of Madagascar
Butterflies of Africa
Taxa named by Per Olof Christopher Aurivillius